Alauna is the feminine form of the Gaulish god Alaunus or (possibly) an unrelated Celtic river goddess in her own right.

It appeared as the Latinized form of various placenames in Celtic Europe:

Places
France
Alauna or Alaunia, the Roman settlement at Valognes in Normandy
Alauna or Alaunus, the Roman name of the River Aulne in Brittany

England
Alauna Carvetiorum, the Roman coastal fort and settlement at Maryport in Cumbria
Alauna, Alavana, Alona, or Alunna, generally identified with the Roman fort at Watercrook near Kendal in Cumbria
Alauna, the Roman settlement at Alcester in Warwickshire
The River Aln, sometimes identified with the Alauna or Alaunos River in Ptolemy's Geography
The Roman settlement at Learchild, sometimes identified with the Alauna in Ptolemy's Geography

Scotland
The Allan Water, sometimes identified with the Alauna or Alaunos River in Ptolemy's Geography
Ardoch in Perthshire, sometimes identified with the Alauna in Ptolemy's Geography
United States
Alauna, California, a village located between Trabuco Creek and Tijeras Creek

See also
 Alaunus
 Alona (disambiguation)